Yekaterina Vinogradova (born 8 October 1980) is a Russian swimmer. She competed at the 2000 Summer Olympics in the 100 m and 200 m butterfly and finished in 31st and 18th place, respectively.

References

External links
 
 
 

1980 births
Living people
Olympic swimmers of Russia
Swimmers at the 2000 Summer Olympics
Russian female butterfly swimmers
Universiade medalists in swimming
Universiade silver medalists for Russia
Medalists at the 2001 Summer Universiade